The 2015–16 Kategoria e Parë was competed between 20 teams in 2 groups, A and B, respectively.

Stadia by capacity and locations

Group A

Group B

League tables

Group A

Group B

Final

Foreign players

References

2015-16
2
2015–16 in European second tier association football leagues